The Southeastern Military Command (CMSE) is one of eight Military Commands of the Brazilian Army. It is responsible for the defence of the state of São Paulo.

Current Structure 

 Southeastern Military Command (Comando Militar do Sudeste) in São Paulo
 HQ Company Southeastern Military Command (Companhia de Comando do Comando Militar do Sudeste) in São Paulo 
 2nd Military Police Battalion (2º Batalhão de Polícia do Exército) in Osasco
 8th Military Police Battalion (8º Batalhão de Polícia do Exército) in São Paulo
 3rd Military Intelligence Company (3ª Companhia de Inteligência) in São Paulo
 Ibirapuera Administration and Support Base (Base de Administração e Apoio do Ibirapuera) in São Paulo
 2nd Military Region (2ª Região Militar) in São Paulo
 HQ Company 2nd Military Region (Companhia de Comando do 2ª Região Militar) in São Paulo 
 21st Supply Depot (21º Depósito de Suprimento) in São Paulo
 22nd Supply Depot (22º Depósito de Suprimento) in Barueri
 São Paulo Military Area Hospital (Hospital Militar de Área de São Paulo) in São Paulo
 2nd Transport Company (2ª Companhia de Transporte) in São Paulo
 4th Military Service Circumscription (4ª Circunscrição de Serviço Militar) in São Paulo
 5th Military Service Circumscription (5ª Circunscrição de Serviço Militar) in Ribeirão Preto
 6th Military Service Circumscription (6ª Circunscrição de Serviço Militar) in Bauru
 14th Military Service Circumscription (14ª Circunscrição de Serviço Militar) in Sorocaba
 Army Aviation Command (Comando de Aviação do Exército) in Taubaté
 HQ Company Army Aviation Commad (Companhia de Comando do Comando de Aviação do Exército) in Taubaté
 1st Army Aviation Battalion (1º Batalhão de Aviação do Exército) in Taubaté 
 2nd Army Aviation Battalion (2º Batalhão de Aviação do Exército) in Taubaté
 Army Aviation Maintenance and Supply Battalion (Batalhão de Manutenção e Suprimento de Aviação do Exército) in Taubaté
 Army Aviation Signals Company (Companhia de Comunicações de Aviação do Exército) in Taubaté
 Army Aviation Instruction Center (Centro de Instrução de Aviação do Exército) in Taubaté
 Taubaté Aviation Base (Base de Aviação de Taubaté) in Taubaté
 1st Air Defence Artillery Brigade (1ª Brigada de Artilharia Anti-Aérea) in Guarujá
 HQ Battery 1st Air Defence Artillery Brigade (Bateria Comando 1ª Brigada de Artilharia Anti-Aérea) in Guarujá
 1st Air Defence Artillery Group (1º Grupo de Artilharia Antiaérea) in Rio de Janeiro
 2nd Air Defence Artillery Group (2º Grupo de Artilharia Antiaérea) in Praia Grande
 3rd Air Defence Artillery Group (3º Grupo de Artilharia Antiaérea) in Caxias do Sul
 4th Air Defence Artillery Group (4° Grupo de Artilharia Antiaerea) in Sete Lagoas
 11th Air Defence Artillery Group (11° Grupo de Artilharia Antiaerea) in Brasília
 2nd Army Division (2ª Divisão de Exército) in São Paulo
 HQ Company 2nd Army Division (Companhia de Comando do 2ª Divisão de Exército) in São Paulo 
 2nd Division Artillery (Artilharia Divisionária da 2ª Divisão de Exército) in São Paulo
 12th Field Artillery Group (12º Grupo de Artilharia de Campanha) in Jundiaí
 11th Light Infantry Brigade (11ª Brigada de Infantaria Leve)) in Campinas
 HQ Company 11th Light Infantry Brigade (Companhia de Comando da 11ª Brigada de Infantaria Leve) in Campinas
 13th Mechanized Cavalry Regiment (13º Regimento de Cavalaria Mecanizado) in Pirassununga
 2nd Light Infantry Battalion (2º Batalhão de Infantaria Leve) in São Vicente
 28th Light Infantry Battalion (28º Batalhão de Infantaria Leve) in Campinas
 37th Light Infantry Battalion (37º Batalhão de Infantaria Leve) in Lins
 2nd Light Field Artillery Group (2º Grupo de Artilharia de Campanha Leve) in Itu
 2nd Light Logistics Battalion (2º Batalhão Logístico Leve) in Campinas
 11th Light Combat Engineer Company (11ª Companhia de Engenharia de Combate Leve) in Pindamonhangaba
 11th Light Anti-air Artillery Battery (11ª Bateria de Artilharia Anti-Aérea Leve) in Itu
 2nd Light Signals Company (2ª Companhia de Comunicações Leve) in Campinas
 11th Military Police Platoon (11º Pelotão de Polícia do Exército) in Campinas
 12th Light Infantry (Airmobile) Brigade (12ª Brigada de Infantaria Leve (Aeromóvel)) in Caçapava
 HQ Company 12th Light Infantry (Airmobile) Brigade (Companhia de Comando da 12ª Brigada de Infantaria Leve (Aeromóvel)) in Caçapava
 4th Light Infantry Battalion (4º Batalhão de Infantaria Leve) in Osasco
 5th Light Infantry Battalion (5º Batalhão de Infantaria Leve) in Lorena
 6th Light Infantry Battalion (6º Batalhão de Infantaria Leve) in Caçapava
 20th Light Field Artillery Group (20º Grupo de Artilharia de Campanha Leve) in Barueri
 22nd Light Logistics Battalion (22º Batalhão Logístico Leve) in Barueri
 1st Light Cavalry Squadron (1º Esquadrão de Cavalaria Leve) in Valença 
 12th Light Combat Engineer Company (12ª Companhia de Engenharia de Combate Leve) in Pindamonhangaba
 5th Light Anti-air Artillery Battery (5ª Bateria de Artilharia Anti-Aérea Leve) in Osasco
 12th Light Signals Company (12ª Companhia de Comunicações Leve) in Caçapava
 12th Military Police Platoon (12º Pelotão de Polícia do Exército'') in Caçapava

References

Commands of the Brazilian Armed Forces
Regional commands of the Brazilian Army